43 Songs is a three-CD box set by French avant-rock band Etron Fou Leloublan (EFL). It contains all tracks from the band's five studio albums, Batelages (1977), Les Trois Fous Perdégagnent (Au Pays Des...) (1978), Les Poumons Gonflés (1982), Les Sillons de la Terre (1984) and Face Aux Éléments Déchaînés (1985). It was released in 1991. Some of the tracks were mastered from particularly noisy vinyl sources and there is no booklet included. 

The box set cover depicts "Crazy Shit, The White Wolf" (the rough English translation of the band's name) on top of a broken Eiffel Tower.

Background
Etron Fou Leloublan (EFL), together with Henry Cow (England), Stormy Six (Italy), Samla Mammas Manna (Sweden) and Univers Zero (Belgium), was one of the five original Rock in Opposition (RIO) bands that performed at the inaugural RIO festival in London on 12 March 1978. RIO was a musical collective of experimental music groups united in their opposition to the music industry. EFL recorded five studio albums between 1976 and 1985, and their music has been described as "Art rock with a twisted A". Their compositions are "fractured" elements of jazz, rock and pop with unusual structures that sometimes sound like "demented and absurdist small-orchestra hymns". The 43 Songs box set covers EFL's entire recording career.

Track listing
Source:

Personnel
Source:

Etron Fou Leloublan
Ferdinand Richard – bass guitar, vocals
Guigou Chenevier – drums, percussion, tenor saxophone, vocals
Chris Chanet (Eulalie Ruynat) (1.1–5) – winds, vocals
Francis Grand (1.6–10, 2.1–2) – alto and tenor saxophone, melodica, flute, harmonica, zither, vocals
Jo Thirion (2.3–17, 3.1–16) – organ, piano, trumpet, vocals
Bernard Mathieu (2.3–12) – soprano and tenor saxophone
Bruno Meillier (2.13–17, 3.1–5) – alto, tenor and baritone saxophones

Guests
Jean-Pierre Grasset (1.6–9) – guitars
Michel Grezes (2.12) – voice
Fred Frith (2.8, 2.12, 3.8–9, 3.13, 3.15) – guitar, violin

Production
Batelages (1977)
Recorded in November 1976
Produced by Etron Fou Leloublan
Les Trois Fous Perdégagnent (Au Pays Des...) (1978)
Recorded at Studio Tangara, Toulouse, France in November 1977
Produced by Etron Fou Leloublan
Les Poumons Gonflés (1982)
Recorded at THC, Bernex, Switzerland in November 1981
Produced by Fred Frith
Les Sillons de la Terre (1984)
Recorded at Studio THC, Geneva, Switzerland, 20–30 August 1983
Produced by Guigou Chenevier
Face Aux Éléments Déchaînés (1985)
Recorded at Sunrise Studio, Kirchberg, Switzerland, August 1985
Produced by Fred Frith

References

External links

1991 compilation albums
Experimental music compilation albums